The following are the national records in athletics in Malta maintained by its national athletics federation: Malta Amateur Athletic Association (MAAA).

Outdoor
Key to tables:

h = hand timing

Mx = record set in a mixed race

Men

Women

Indoor

Men

Women

Notes

References
General
Maltese Records 12 February 2022 updated
Specific

External links
MAAA web site

Malta
Records
Athletics